George Britton Halford (26 November 1824 – 27 May 1910) was an English-born anatomist and physiologist, founder of the first medical school in Australia, University of Melbourne School of Medicine.

Background 
Halford was born in Petworth, Sussex, England, second son of James Halford, a merchant of Haverstock Hill, and his wife Nancy, née Gadd. Halford began studying medicine in 1842, became a member of the Royal College of Physicians in 1851, and of the Royal College of Surgeons in 1852. He obtained his doctorate of medicine at University of St Andrews in 1854. After practising at Liverpool, he was in 1857 appointed lecturer in anatomy at the Grosvenor Place school of medicine, London. When applications were called for the professorship of anatomy, physiology and pathology at the University of Melbourne in 1862, he was described as "one of the most distinguished experimental physiologists of the day". There were other good candidates, but Halford was appointed, and he arrived in Melbourne on 22 December 1862. A medical curriculum had been drawn up by the council for which the vice-chancellor, Dr Anthony Brownless, was largely responsible. This course was longer by a year than any systematic course of medical education then existing in Great Britain or Ireland. Thirty years passed before the general medical council implied on a minimum five-year course in the United Kingdom.

Studies 

Halford began teaching with only three students which in the next 15 years increased to about 70. His task indeed was only made possible by the comparatively small classes in those early years. He was offered the fellowship of the Royal College of Physicians in 1870 but never actually went in. He had in the meantime done some research work in comparative anatomy, and had begun his work on the poison of snakes which he continued for many years. As Halford neared 60 years, he began to feel the strain of his combined offices, but the appointment of a brilliant young assistant, Harry Brookes Allen, who became lecturer in anatomy and pathology in 1882, must have made his position easier. Allen became professor of descriptive and surgical anatomy and pathology in 1883, and Halford took the title of professor of general anatomy, physiology and histology. Though easing down in his work to some extent, he was still a great influence with the students. Sir Richard Stawell, who graduated in 1898, has testified that "there was something always really 'great' about the old professor; and when he discussed with us the records of his original work of long ago, there was to be got from his lectures something splendid and even inspiring" (address at the Masonic Hall, 1 May 1914). In September 1896 Halford was given leave of absence on account of ill-health until the end of 1897. This leave was afterwards extended and he did not become emeritus professor until 1900. After his retirement he lived at Beaconsfield near Melbourne and was much interested in the development of coal-mining in South Gippsland. He celebrated his golden wedding in 1907 and died at Inverloch, Victoria, on 27 May 1910. He was survived by three daughters and six sons, two of whom entered the medical profession. In 1928 his family founded the  Halford Oration at the Australian Institute of Anatomy, Canberra. A list of Halford's contributions to medical literature can be found in the Medical Journal of Australia for 19 January 1929, page 71.

Creationism

Halford was a creationist who rejected evolution. He criticized the idea of common descent and challenged the views of T. H. Huxley. He argued that humans and apes shared no common ancestor. In his book on snake venom he wrote that the snake had been designed by "some omnipotent power with infinite will."

Publications

On the Time and Manner of Closure of the Auriculo-Ventricular Valves (1861)
Not Like Man, Bimanous and Biped, nor yet Quadrumanous, but Cheiropodous (1863)
Lines of Demarcation Between Man, Gorilla, & Macaque (1864)
Thoughts, Observations and Experiments on the Action of Snake Venom on the Blood (1894)

See also 
Royal College of Physicians

References

K. F. Russell, 'Halford, George Britton (1824 - 1910)', Australian Dictionary of Biography, Volume 4, MUP, 1972, pp 321–322. Retrieved 3 January 2009

Further reading

Barry Butcher. (1988). Gorilla Warfare in Melbourne: Halford, Huxley and Man's Place in Nature. In R. W. Home. Australian Science in the Making. Cambridge University Press. pp. 153–167. 

1824 births
1910 deaths
British Christian creationists
Alumni of the University of St Andrews
Australian people of English descent
Australian physiologists
English anatomists
English physiologists
People from Petworth
Academic staff of the University of Melbourne